Michael David Lampman (born April 20, 1950) is a Canadian-born American former professional ice hockey player. Lampman played four seasons for the University of Denver, and was selected in the 1970 NHL Amateur Draft by the St. Louis Blues. Making his professional debut in 1972, Lampman played 96 games in the National Hockey League over 4 seasons for the Blues, Vancouver Canucks, and Washington Capitals, and also spent time in the American Hockey League and Western Hockey League before retiring in 1977.

Playing career
Lampman moved to Lakewood, California when he was twelve. He was the first Southern California-trained player drafted into the NHL. He played college hockey at the University of Denver.

Selected in the 1970 NHL Entry Draft by the St. Louis Blues, Lampman played parts of two seasons with the Blues before he was traded to the Vancouver Canucks. He was claimed by the Washington Capitals in the 1974 NHL Expansion Draft, where he played until he retired during the 1976–77 NHL season.

Post-playing career
After retiring from hockey, Lampman moved to Hawaii, where he worked as a loan officer.

Career statistics

Regular season and playoffs

References

External links

Profile at hockeydraftcentral.com

1950 births
Living people
American men's ice hockey left wingers
Baltimore Clippers players
Canadian ice hockey left wingers
Denver Pioneers men's ice hockey players
Denver Spurs players
Ice hockey players from California
Ice hockey people from Ontario
Marquette Iron Rangers players
People from Lakewood, California
Richmond Robins players
Seattle Totems (WHL) players
St. Louis Blues draft picks
St. Louis Blues players
Sportspeople from Hamilton, Ontario
Vancouver Canucks players
Washington Capitals players